Boundary or Boundaries may refer to:

 Border, in political geography

Entertainment
Boundaries (2016 film), a 2016 Canadian film
Boundaries (2018 film), a 2018 American-Canadian road trip film
Boundary (cricket), the edge of the playing field, or a scoring shot where the ball is hit to or beyond that point
Boundary (sports), the sidelines of a field

Mathematics and physics
Boundary (topology), the closure minus the interior of a subset of a topological space; an edge in the topology of manifolds, as in the case of a 'manifold with boundary'
Boundary (graph theory), the vertices of edges between a subgraph and the rest of a graph
Boundary (chain complex), its abstractization in chain complexes
Boundary value problem, a differential equation together with a set of additional restraints called the boundary conditions
Boundary (thermodynamics), the edge of a thermodynamic system across which heat, mass, or work can flow

Psychology and sociology
Personal boundaries, a life skill for protecting against having personal values compromised or violated
Boundaries of the mind, the degree of separateness between fantasy and reality
Professional boundaries, relationship between any professional and their client
Symbolic boundaries, a theory of how people form social groups proposed by cultural sociologists
Boundary-work, sociology of divisions between fields of knowledge

Places

Boundary, Derbyshire, a hamlet and former civil parish in South Derbyshire and Leicestershire, England
Boundary, Staffordshire, a village in Staffordshire, England
Boundary Ranges, also known as the Boundary Range, a mountain range in British Columbia, Canada and Alaska, United States
Boundary County, ID, the northernmost county in Idaho
Boundary Country, a region of southern British Columbia, Canada
Kootenay Boundary Regional District, a regional district in British Columbia
West Kootenay-Boundary, a provincial electoral district in British Columbia
Okanagan-Boundary, a former provincial electoral district in British Columbia
Boundary-Similkameen, a former provincial electoral district in British Columbia
Boundary Falls, British Columbia, also known as Boundary, a former railway town in the Boundary Country of British Columbia
Boundary Waters, a region on the boundary between Ontario and Minnesota
Stikine, British Columbia, called Boundary from 1930 to 1964, a former customs post on the Stikine River at the Alaska–British Columbia border
Boundary City, Indiana, a community in the United States

Other uses
, a number of ships with this name
Boundaries in landscape history, the divide between areas of differing land used
Boundary (real estate), the legal boundary between units of real property
Boundary (company), an American application performance management company
Boundary critique, a concept about the meaning and validity of propositions
Boundary turbulence, a break in expectation of how private information is held within a group of knowledge owners
Boundary Ale, a beer made by Moosehead Breweries
Geological boundary, a boundary between different geological units
Boundary, software for secure remote access to systems based on trusted identity developed by HashiCorp

See also
 Boundary representation
 Bound (disambiguation)
 The Boundary (disambiguation)